Denzil Tulser (born 8 August 1948), is a character in the popular BBC sitcom Only Fools and Horses played by Paul Barber.

Denzil is a long-distance lorry driver originating from Liverpool, a good friend of Derek Trotter and one of Del's frequent victims when it comes to dubious antics. In the 1983 episode "Who's A Pretty Boy?", Denzil's wife Corinne saw through Del and stated that whenever Denzil and Del got together, Denzil ended up drunk or out of pocket, to which Denzil protests; "Yeah I know, but he's a mate."

Del earned Corinne's hatred by ruining her wedding day food after his fridge broke down, leaving the guests eating pie and chips and Corinne and Denzil cutting a jam sponge instead of their wedding cake. The final straw came when Denzil hired Del, Rodney and Grandad to paint the living room. They burnt a hole through the bottom of the kettle, ruining the kitchen with the steam, and thought they had killed Corinne's canary. Desperate, they sent Grandad to buy a replacement bird, hoping to trick Corinne. The plan however backfired, as Corinne came home and told them she had found the bird dead earlier that morning before she left for work.

Eva Mottley, who played Corrine, committed suicide in 1985, having appeared in only one episode. Following this, Corrine was written out and it was revealed that she and Denzil later divorced, with Denzil's trade as a long-distance lorry driver contributed to the divorce.

In the 1985 Christmas special "To Hull and Back", while driving to Hull, he began to hear Del's voice. Del had been locked into the back of the lorry, after using it for a secret meeting with Boycie and Abdul. Arriving at Hull, Denzil headed into a café to get breakfast. When eating, he saw a reflection of Del's Reliant Regal van driving past. He then saw Del when stopped at a crossroads. Thinking he was hallucinating, Denzil headed to the cliffs to relax. However he then saw Del on a fishing trawler heading out to sea. Although Denzil did not actually imagine any of these things, he ran off shouting hysterically "I'm sick!". During a police investigation into diamond smuggling later in the episode, it was revealed Denzil had had a nervous breakdown.

Denzil, who has five brothers, moved to Peckham from Liverpool aged 13. He attended Dockside Secondary Modern and managed to make his way into the gang of Del, Trigger and Boycie. When in detention in the science labs, Denzil had his eyebrows burnt off after Del and Trigger blew the lab up with homemade fireworks.

In "The Jolly Boys' Outing", it was revealed that Denzil used to work as a bus driver with Sid, which meant he drove the coach to and from Margate after Harry the bus driver was overcome with fumes and incapacitated.

Denzil made his last appearance in the first episode of the spinoff show The Green Green Grass, when he informed Boycie that the Driscoll Brothers were being paroled. He was also seen in the episode "I Done It My Way" in 2009, where he appeared in a flashback episode of Only Fools and Horses.

Denzil also appeared in Rock & Chips in 2010, portrayed by Ashley Jerlach, who imitated Barber's distinctive Liverpool accent for the role.

References

Fictional truck drivers
Only Fools and Horses characters
Fictional people from Liverpool
Television characters introduced in 1983
Fictional Black British people
Male characters in television